Brigadier General Virgil Almos Richard ( September 4, 1937 – September 11, 2013) was a US Army General who served 32 years of active military service of which 30 were devoted to Financial Management. Richard became an outspoken critic of the "Don't ask, don't tell" policy of the U.S. Armed Forces and gained national media attention as a part of a small group of high-ranking military officers who came out as gay after retirement.

Early life
Richard was born in Anthony, Kansas, and grew up in rural Wakita, Oklahoma. He received his BS in accounting from Oklahoma State University (where he was a member of Phi Kappa Tau fraternity), his Master of Business Administration (Managerial Economics) from George Washington University and was a graduate of the Advanced Management Program of Columbia University, the U.S. Army Command and General Staff College and the U.S. Army War College. He was also an ROTC Distinguished Military Graduate.

Career
Richard was an Officer of the Association of the United States Army chapters in Alaska and Indiana, Commander of the Harker Heights, Texas American Legion Post and Assistant State Treasurer of the Texas Department of the American Legion. He was also a Board Member of the Austin Exchange Club, The Texas District Exchange Clubs, and formerly a Board Member of the Capital City Men's Chorus in Austin, Texas.

He is a recipient of the Army Distinguished Service Medal, the Bronze Star with 1 Oak Leaf Cluster, the Legion of Merit with 4 Oak Leaf Clusters, Army Meritorious Service Medal with two Oak Leaf Clusters, Joint Service Commendation Medal, and the Army Commendation Medal with one Oak Leaf Cluster.

  Army Distinguished Service Medal
  Legion of Merit with four oak leaf clusters
  Bronze Star with one oak leaf cluster
  Meritorious Service Medal with two oak leaf clusters
  Joint Service Commendation Medal
  Army Commendation Medal with oak leaf cluster

Personal life
Richard had three sons from his marriage to the late Bonnie Raylene Farrar.  Throughout his military career, Richard had assignments in Honolulu, HI, Anchorage, AK, Indianapolis, IN, Washington, DC, and retired in 1991 at Fort Hood, TX.  From 1998 until his death, he lived in Austin, Texas with his partner of 16 years, David W. Potter.

References

External links
Gay Ex-Officers Say 'Don't Ask' Doesn't Work (originally published by The New York Times, December 9, 2003)

2013 deaths
Recipients of the Distinguished Service Medal (US Army)
Recipients of the Legion of Merit
United States Army generals
Columbia University alumni
George Washington University School of Business alumni
Oklahoma State University alumni
American LGBT military personnel
1937 births
United States Army Command and General Staff College alumni
People from Grant County, Oklahoma
People from Anthony, Kansas
LGBT people from Kansas
Recipients of the Meritorious Service Medal (United States)